Senator Cahill may refer to:

Máiría Cahill (born 1981), Seanad Éireann (Senate of Ireland)
Meg Burton Cahill (born 1954), Arizona State Senate
Pamela Cahill (fl. 1980s–2000s), Maine State Senate
Pierce Cahill (1869–1935), South Dakota State Senate
Terry H. Cahal (1802–1851), Tennessee State Senate